Chilworth may refer to:
Chilworth, Hampshire
Chilworth, Surrey
Chilworth railway station in Chilworth, Surrey
 Chilworth nature reserve, Beecroft, New South Wales